Stephen Joel Barrett (born 1933) is an American retired psychiatrist, author, co-founder of the National Council Against Health Fraud (NCAHF), and the webmaster of Quackwatch. He runs a number of websites dealing with quackery and health fraud. He focuses on consumer protection, medical ethics, and scientific skepticism.

Biography

Barrett is a 1957 graduate of the Columbia University College of Physicians and Surgeons and completed his psychiatry residency in 1961. In 1967 and 1968 he completed part of a correspondence course in American Law and Procedure at La Salle Extension University (Chicago). He was a practicing physician until retiring from active practice in 1993. , his medical license was listed as "Expired" in good standing: "No disciplinary actions were found for this license." A longtime resident of Allentown, Pennsylvania, Barrett now resides in Chapel Hill, North Carolina.

In addition to webmastering his websites, Barrett was a co-founder, vice-president and a board member of the National Council Against Health Fraud (NCAHF). He is a scientific advisor to the American Council on Science and Health, and a fellow of the Committee for Skeptical Inquiry (CSI). From 1987 through 1989, he taught health education at Pennsylvania State University.

Barrett was the consulting editor for the Consumer Health Library at Prometheus Books, and has been a peer-review panelist for  two medical journals. He has also served on the editorial board of Medscape and the Scientific Review of Alternative Medicine. According to his website, he "has written more than 2,000 articles and delivered more than 300 talks at colleges, universities, medical schools, and professional meetings. His media appearances include Dateline, Today, Good Morning America, Primetime, Donahue, CNN, National Public Radio, and more than 200 other radio and television talk show interviews."

Quackwatch received the award of Best Physician-Authored Site by MD NetGuide, May 2003. In 1984, he received an FDA Commissioner's Special Citation Award for Public Service in fighting nutrition quackery. He was included in the list of outstanding skeptics of the 20th century by Skeptical Inquirer magazine. In 1986, he was awarded honorary membership in the American Dietetic Association. Barrett has been profiled in Biography Magazine (1998) and in Time (2001).

The magazine Spiked included Barrett in a survey of 134 persons they termed "key thinkers in science, technology and medicine." When he was asked: "What inspired you to take up science?" he replied that his appreciation of medical science:

probably began when I took a college course in medical statistics, and learned what makes the difference between scientific thought and poor reasoning. Medical school brought me in touch with the rapid and amazing strides being made in the understanding and treatment of disease. My anti-quackery activities have intensified my interest and concern in distinguishing science from pseudoscience, quackery and fraud.

Consumer information 

The Quackwatch website is Barrett's main platform for describing and exposing what he and other contributors consider to be quackery and health fraud. The website was part of Quackwatch, Inc., a nonprofit corporation founded by Barrett that aims to "combat health-related frauds, myths, fads, fallacies, and misconduct." The non-profit was dissolved in 2008. Barrett's writing is supplemented with contributions from many scientific, technical, and lay volunteers and includes numerous references to published research articles. Barrett defines quackery as "anything involving overpromotion in the field of health," and reserves the word fraud "only for situations in which deliberate deception is involved."
Barrett has become a "lightning rod" for controversy as a result of his criticisms of alternative medicine theories and practitioners. Barrett says he does not criticize conventional medicine because that would be "way outside [his] scope." He states he does not give equal time to some subjects, and has written on his web site that "Quackery and fraud don't involve legitimate controversy and are not balanced subjects. I don't believe it is helpful to publish 'balanced' articles about unbalanced subjects." Barrett is at the forefront of exposing questionable aspects of chiropractic.

Barrett is a strong supporter of the HONcode and has made efforts to improve compliance with its rules and to expose those who abuse it.

A number of practitioners and supporters of alternative medicine oppose Barrett and Quackwatch for its criticism of alternative medicine. Donna Ladd, a journalist with The Village Voice, says Barrett relies mostly on negative research to criticize alternative medicine, rejecting most positive case studies as unreliable due to methodological flaws. According to Ladd, Barrett insists that most alternative therapies "simply should be disregarded without further research. 'A lot of things don't need to be tested [because] they simply don't make any sense', he says, pointing to homeopathy, chiropractic, and acupuncture as examples of alternative treatments with no plausible mechanism of action."

Both website reviews and various journal articles mention or use as references Stephen Barrett's Quackwatch as a useful source for consumer information. However, other authors have criticised Quackwatch as being overly biased in its presentation.

In February 2020, Quackwatch became part of the Center for Inquiry. CFI maintains its various websites.

Publications 
Barrett's articles include:
 In 1985, Barrett was the author of the "Commercial hair analysis. Science or scam?" article in the Journal of the American Medical Association that exposed commercial laboratories performing multimineral hair analysis. He commented that in his opinion, "commercial use of hair analysis in this manner is unscientific, economically wasteful, and probably illegal." His report has been cited in later articles, including one which concluded that such testing was "unreliable."
 "A Close Look at Therapeutic Touch", Rosa L, Rosa E, Sarner L, Barrett SJ. (April 1, 1998). JAMA, Vol. 279, No. 13, pp 1005–1010.

His (co)authored and (co)edited books include:
 Consumer Health: A Guide to Intelligent Decisions, Barrett S, London William, Kroger M, Hall H, Baretz R (2013). (textbook, 9th ed.) McGraw-Hill, 
 Dubious Cancer Treatment, Barrett SJ & Cassileth BR, editors (2001). Florida Division of the American Cancer Society
 Chemical Sensitivity: The Truth About Environmental Illness (Consumer Health Library), Barrett, SJ & Gots, Ronald E. (1998). Prometheus Books. 
 The Health Robbers: A Close Look at Quackery in America, Barrett SJ, Jarvis WT, eds. (1993). Prometheus Books, 
 Health Schemes, Scams, and Frauds, Barrett SJ (1991). Consumer Reports Books, 
 Reader's Guide to Alternative Health Methods, Zwicky JF, Hafner AW, Barrett S, Jarvis WT (1993). American Medical Association, 
 The Vitamin Pushers: How the "Health Food" Industry Is Selling America a Bill of Goods, Barrett SJ, Herbert V (1991). Prometheus Books, 
 Vitamins and Minerals: Help or Harm?, Marshall CW (1983). Lippincott Williams & Wilkins  (edited by Barrett, won the American Medical Writers Association award for best book of 1983 for the general public, republished by Consumer Reports Books).

Collections of articles:
 Paranormal Claims: A Critical Analysis, 2007, edited by Bryan Farha, University Press of America, . Three of the eighteen chapters are written by Barrett.

See also 
 Barrett v. Rosenthal
 Consumer protection
 Debunker
 Evidence-based medicine
 Pseudoscience

References

External links 

 Quackwatch.org

1933 births
American health activists
American psychiatrists
American science writers
American skeptics
Columbia University Vagelos College of Physicians and Surgeons alumni
Critics of alternative medicine
La Salle Extension University alumni
Living people
Pennsylvania State University faculty
Writers from Allentown, Pennsylvania
Writers from New York City